AliGenie is a China-based open-platform intelligent personal assistant launched and developed by Alibaba Group, currently used in the Tmall Genie smart speaker. The platform was introduced in 2017, along with the Tmall Genie X1, at Alibaba's 2017 Computing Conference in Hangzhou.

Features 
Similar to other virtual assistants, AliGenie is capable of smart home control, music playback, voice shopping, taking notes and more. AliGenie also features voice recognition, voiceprint recognition, semantic understanding and speech synthesis.

AliGenie also integrates with Alibaba Group's services, such as online payment service Alipay and shopping platform Taobao and Tmall. AliGenie's voiceprint recognition technology offered security by only allowing authorized users to place online orders.

Open platform 
AliGenie is an open platform, allowing different manufactures to work on the system and add it to third party products.

References 

Alibaba Group
Virtual assistants